Bannay is a commune in the Cher department in the Centre-Val de Loire region of France.

Geography

Population

Places of interest
 The church of St.Julien, dating from the 15th century.
 Vestiges of a Roman bathhouse.
 Three watermills, at Deza, Granger and Fricambaut.
 An eighteenth-century château, with a park designed by Le Nôtre.

See also
Communes of the Cher department

References

External links

Website about Bannay 
Bannay on the Quid website 

Communes of Cher (department)